Nina Czegledy is a Canadian artist, new media art curator and writer.

Life
Elinor Nina Czegledy (born in Budapest, Hungary) is based in Toronto, Canada. She is an interdisciplinary artist, curator and educator who works on art, science and technology collaborations around the world and on the Internet. Before focusing on new media art, Czegledy made broadcast documentary films.

Work
Czegledy's writing, art and curating explores the connection between art, science and the body.

Czegledy has curated numerous thematic exhibitions: 
 Aura/Aurora explored the Aurora Borealis form the perspectives of art, science and technology,
Splice: at the Intersection of Art and Medicine
 In Sight: Media Art From the Middle of Europe at YYZ gallery, Toronto, 
 
Czegledy has been a research fellow at the University of Toronto, a senior fellow of the Hungarian University of Fine Arts, an adjunct professor at Concordia University, and a member of the Leonardo/ISAST board and education forum.

Selected publications

References

External links 
 Official site

Living people
Canadian women artists
Place of birth missing (living people)
Hungarian emigrants to Canada
Canadian art curators
Artists from Budapest
Year of birth missing (living people)
Canadian women curators